Mitar Djuric (born ) or Dimitris Tzourits is a Serbian-Greek male volleyball player. He competed at the 2011 FIVB Volleyball Men's Club World Championship with Trentino Volley.

Sporting achievements

Clubs

CEV Champions League
  2015/2016 - with Trentino Diatec

Greek Volleyball League

 2009, 2010, 2011

Greek Volleyball Cup

 2009, 2011

Greek Volleyball Super Cup

 2010, 2021

Italian Volleyball League

 2013, 2015

Italian Volleyball Cup

 2012, 2013

Italian Volleyball Super Cup

 2011

FIVB Volleyball Men's Club World Championship

 2011, 2012

Turkish Volleyball League

 2014

Turkish Volleyball Cup

 2014

Turkish Volleyball Super Cup

 2014

MEVZA League

 2021

Individual 
Greek Volley League MVP

 2009

References

External links
 profile at FIVB.org

1989 births
Living people
Greek men's volleyball players
Olympiacos S.C. players
A.C. Orestias players
Greek people of Serbian descent
Sportspeople from Sarajevo
Volleyball players from Orestiada